Nudnida "Chun" Luangnam (born 27 February 1987) is a former tennis player from Thailand. She has career-high WTA rankings of 195 in singles, set on 13 May 2013, and 342 in doubles, achieved on 13 November 2017.

Career overview
She took part in the 2007 Bangalore Open but lost in the first round.

In 2013, Luangnam qualified for the Auckland Open defeating players like Irina Falconi, Irena Pavlovic and Gréta Arn, before losing to Romina Oprandi. She then played the qualifying event of the Australian Open but lost in the first round to Estrella Cabeza Candela. Luangnam had some WTA Tour success when she qualified for the Malaysian Open defeating Chan Chin-wei and Monique Adamczak and then reached the second round, beating Zheng Saisai in the first, before falling to Ayumi Morita. She then played qualifying for the French Open but lost to Aleksandra Krunić in the first round.

In her career, she won 13 titles in singles and 13 in doubles on tournaments of the ITF Women's Circuit.

ITF Circuit finals

Singles: 26 (13 titles, 13 runner–ups)

Doubles (13–7)

References

External links
 
 
 

Living people
Nudnida Luangnam
Asian Games medalists in tennis
1987 births
Tennis players at the 2010 Asian Games
Nudnida Luangnam
Nudnida Luangnam
Medalists at the 2010 Asian Games
Universiade medalists in tennis
Nudnida Luangnam
Nudnida Luangnam
Southeast Asian Games medalists in tennis
Competitors at the 2007 Southeast Asian Games
Competitors at the 2009 Southeast Asian Games
Universiade gold medalists for Thailand
Medalists at the 2011 Summer Universiade
Nudnida Luangnam